St. John's High School is an Edmund Rice Educational Institute, founded by the Congregation of Christian Brothers in 1959. The school building was designed by prominent French architect Pierre Jeanneret. It is located in Sector 26, Chandigarh. It has been consistently ranked as one of the best schools in the Tri-City area (Chandigarh, Mohali and Panchkula) for the years 2013, 2014, and 2015.

St. John's Old Boys Association 

St. John's Old Boys Association (SJOBA) is an alumni association formed by the students who attended the school. It has around 3700 members. It is managed by an executive body chosen from within the community each year. SJOBA completed 30 years in 2009.

It organizes events such as blood donation camps. The year-end vocational counselling for students passing out is an annual tradition. It conducts the annual debate for students of the Senior Wing, an Annual Quiz, and sports events such as football and cricket matches between the school teams and a team of old boys.

SJOBA organises recreational events including the SJOBA Thunderbolt Rally around March, the SJOBA Mini-marathon around November and the SJOBA Winter Fest in December, which includes the SJOBA Treasure Hunt, Cultural Evening (plays and musical nights) and the Winterball, which is the annual reunion organised by the alumni.

SJOBA mentors economically challenged students and contributes to the school in the form of sports facilities and financial aid. A wing of SJOBA called the SJOBA Foundation  offers scholarships to students who show promise in the fields of academics and sports.

Notable alumni 

 Ayushmann Khurrana, Indian actor and singer; winner of MTV Roadies season 2
 Sumrit Shahi, best-selling author of Just Friends, Never Kiss Your Best Friend
 Kapil Sibal, former lawyer; politician belonging to Indian National Congress Party
 Jeev Milkha Singh, golfer
 Roopinder Singh, writer, journalist, The Tribune Chandigarh
 Manish Tewari, politician; former Minister of Information and Broadcasting and a Member of Parliament
 Nalin Surie, Indian Foreign Service, Formed High Commissioner 
 Jaideep Varma Writer, filmmaker
 Krishna Pandit, Indian professional footballer

See also
 List of Christian Brothers schools in India

References

External links

 SJOBA's official website
 St. John's High School's website

High schools and secondary schools in Chandigarh
Christian schools in Chandigarh
Congregation of Christian Brothers secondary schools
Educational institutions established in 1960
Boys' schools in India
Catholic secondary schools in India
1960 establishments in East Punjab